Elinore "Lore" Schöpp is a former German curler. She is the mother of two-time World Champion curler Andrea Schöpp.

Teams

References

External links
 

German female curlers
European curling champions
Living people

Year of birth missing (living people)